Ann Linnea Sandberg (August 4, 1938 – December 31, 2009) was an American immunologist and the acting director of the Center for Integrative Craniofacial Research at the National Institute of Dental and Craniofacial Research (NIDCR). Previously, Sandberg was a lab chief and researcher for 23 years in the NIH Intramural Research Program at NIDCR.

Early life and education 
Ann Linnea Sandberg was born on August 4, 1938, in Denver, Colorado, to Ernest Helsing Sandberg and Anna Elvira Sandberg, née Jackson. She had a brother. Her family later moved to Bozeman, Montana. She earned a Bachelor of Science in chemistry from Montana State University. Sandberg completed a doctor of philosophy in pharmacology at University of Chicago in 1964. Her dissertation was titled Characterization and modification of irradiation induced aging in mice. Her doctoral advisor was John Doull. D. G. Oldfield helped Sandberg derive the formula for the calibration of the neutron source and assisted with the mathematical analyses of the mortality data in her doctoral research. Dragoslava Vesselinovitch and Frank W. Fitch provided histological examination of the tissues used in Sandberg's dissertation and H. D. Landahl assisted her with the computer analyses. She received traineeship support form the United States Public Health Service. Sandberg completed postdoctoral research at Tufts University School of Medicine from 1964 to 1968.

Career 
Sandberg held a joint appointment as a research investigator at the New York City Health Department and a research assistant professor at New York University School of Medicine. In 1972, joined the National Institute of Dental Research (NIDCR) as chief of the Humoral Immunity Section of the Laboratory of Microbiology and Immunology. In 1988, she was named chief of the microbial receptors and pathogenesis section, Laboratory of Microbial Ecology. She made noteworthy contributions to the biomedical literature on innate immunity, bacterial activation of neutrophils and infective endocarditis.

After 23 years with the NIH Intramural Research Program, she joined the institute's extramural program in 1995 as chief of the Neoplastic Diseases Branch and was subsequently promoted to lead the Division of Basic and Translational Sciences. Throughout her career, Sandberg also mentored and supported the career development of multiple students, young investigators and postdoctoral fellows. She was acting director of the Center for Integrative Craniofacial Research at the time of her retirement in 2005. She was a member of the American Association for the Advancement of Science and the International Association for Dental Research.

Research 
Sandberg researched inflammation and host defense mechanisms pertaining to autoimmune diseases. She was regarded as an expert on complement activating enzymes and inflammatory diseases. Sandberg also researched microbial adhesion. Sandberg investigated alternate pathways for activation of the cascading sequence of then relatively unknown complement proteins, now recognized to be instrumental in innate and adaptive immunity.

Awards and honors 
Sandberg was recognized with a Montana State University Centennial Alumnae Award. She received several NIH awards including the Merit Award, Special Achievement Award and the Special Act Award.

Personal life 
Sandberg was involved with the Emmanuel Lutheran Church in Bethesda, Maryland and attended their Bible study discussion groups. She had a cabin at Flathead Lake. Sandberg loved her family, literature, music and gardening; after retirement she had reignited her passion for piano lessons. She died on December 31, 2009, at Seeds of Love Care in Livingston, Montana. Sandberg was survived by her sister-in-law, four nieces, and five grand-nephews. She was cremated at Franzen-Davis Crematory.

Selected work

References 

21st-century American women scientists
20th-century American biologists
21st-century American biologists
20th-century American women scientists
Scientists from Montana
Scientists from Colorado
National Institutes of Health people
Montana State University alumni
University of Chicago alumni
American immunologists
Women immunologists
People from Bozeman, Montana
People from Denver
American Lutherans
New York University Grossman School of Medicine faculty
1938 births
2009 deaths
20th-century Lutherans
American women academics